Forficula silana is a species of earwig in the family Forficulidae.

References 

Forficulidae
Insects described in 1881